American rapper and record producer Ye, better known as Kanye West, has released 138 singles, four promotional singles and charted with 65 other songs.

As of July 2022, West is one of only seven artists in the United States to be certified for over 100 million digital singles by the Recording Industry Association of America, having sold 133 million certified digital units as a solo artist. He is the highest certified digital singles artist in the United States with 84 of his singles going platinum. His Billboard Hot 100 history reads; 107 entries, 56 top 40s, 18 top 10s, and four number-one singles. Elsewhere, West has 20 top-ten, and three number-one singles in the UK, as well as, six number ones in New Zealand. West ended the 2000s decade with the most number-one songs on the Hot Rap Songs chart, most digital song certifications by a male solo artist in the United States, and was tenth on Billboards Top Hot 100 Artists of the 2000s chart. As of September 2012, he had the second-most 3 million+ selling digital songs.

In 2003, West collaborated with rapper Twista and singer Jamie Foxx on the song "Slow Jamz", which became West's first single to top the US Billboard Hot 100. In 2004, West's debut album The College Dropout produced four singles, including the Hot 100 top ten single "All Falls Down" and the Grammy Award-winner "Jesus Walks". In 2005, West released his second studio album Late Registration, which featured five singles, including "Touch the Sky", "Heard 'Em Say" and "Gold Digger", the latter spent ten weeks at number one on the Billboard Hot 100, broke digital download records, and was the ninth biggest Hot 100 hit of the 2000s decade.

In 2007, West's third studio album Graduation was released and was supported by five singles, including the Billboard Hot 100 number one single "Stronger" and the top ten single "Good Life". In 2008, West's fourth album 808s & Heartbreak was released and featured two top three singles, "Love Lockdown" and "Heartless". The former became just the second song by a non-American Idol artist to debut in the top three of the Hot 100 of the decade. From 2008 to 2009, West collaborated with other recording artists on multiple Hot 100 top ten singles, including "American Boy" by singer Estelle, "Swagga Like Us" by rappers Jay-Z, Lil Wayne and T.I., "Knock You Down" by singer Keri Hilson, "Run This Town" by Jay-Z and singer Rihanna, and "Forever" with rappers Drake, Lil Wayne and Eminem.

In 2010, West released his fifth studio album My Beautiful Dark Twisted Fantasy; four singles were released from the album, all of which reached the top 25 on the Billboard Hot 100: "Power", "Monster", "Runaway" and "All of the Lights". The following year, West collaborated with American singer Katy Perry on a remix of her song "E.T." which hit number one on the Billboard Hot 100, marking West's fourth number one single on the chart. Watch the Throne, a collaboration with Jay-Z, produced seven singles, including the Billboard Hot 100 top 25 singles "H•A•M", "Otis" and "Niggas in Paris". West's sixth studio album Yeezus, released in 2013, featured the singles "Black Skinhead" and "Bound 2".

"FourFiveSeconds", a 2015 collaboration with Rihanna and musician Paul McCartney, became a top five hit on the Hot 100 and a top ten hit in several other countries. The singles "Famous", "Father Stretch My Hands", which was released as a two-part single, and "Fade" were released in support of West's seventh studio album The Life of Pablo, released in 2016. "Yikes" was released as the first single from Kanye's eighth studio album Ye in 2018 and performed best in Canada by peaking at number 6 on the Canadian Hot 100 and "All Mine" was the second single to be released from the album, which performed best in New Zealand by reaching number 5 on the NZ Top 40 chart.

Singles

As lead artist

As featured artist

Other collaborations

Promotional singles

Other charted and certified songs

Guest appearances

See also
 List of best-selling singles
 List of artists who reached number one in the United States
 List of artists who reached number one on the UK Singles Chart
 List of artists who reached number one in New Zealand
 Kanye West albums discography
 Kids See Ghosts discography
 List of songs recorded by Kanye West

Notes

References

External links
 
 
 
 

Discography
Discographies of American artists
Hip hop discographies